Mikhail Protasevich (born 22 December 1971) is a Belarusian sailor. He competed in the men's 470 event at the 2000 Summer Olympics.

References

External links
 

1971 births
Living people
Belarusian male sailors (sport)
Olympic sailors of Belarus
Sailors at the 2000 Summer Olympics – 470
Sportspeople from Minsk